Frank Emlyn Jones (12 April 1861 – 26 June 1935) was an English priest. He was the Archdeacon of Barnstaple in the Church of England from 1930 to 1935.

Born in Surbiton, Jones was educated at Christ Church, Oxford and ordained in 1885 after covering theological studies at Ripon College Cuddesdon. After a curacy in Bromsgrove he held incumbencies in Bradford and  Great Torrington before his years as an archdeacon.

References

1861 births
Alumni of Christ Church, Oxford
Alumni of Ripon College Cuddesdon
Archdeacons of Barnstaple
1935 deaths
People from Surbiton